Brekken is a former municipality in the old Sør-Trøndelag county, Norway.  The  municipality existed along the border with Sweden from 1926 until its dissolution in 1964.  The municipality is now located in the northeastern part of what is now the municipality of Røros in Trøndelag county.  The municipality encompassed the areas located to the north, east and southeast of the lake Aursunden.  The administrative centre was the village of Brekken where Brekken Church is located.

History

The parish of Brekken was established as a municipality in 1926 when the large municipality of Røros was split into four separate municipalities: Brekken (population: 1,098), Glåmos (population: 983), Røros landsogn (population: 701), and the town of Røros (population: 2,284).  During the 1960s, there were many municipal mergers across Norway due to the work of the Schei Committee.  On 1 January 1964, the four municipalities of Brekken (population: 964), Glåmos (population: 700), Røros landsogn (population: 482), and the town of Røros (population: 3,063) were all reunited under the name Røros.

Name
The municipality is named after the village of Brekken since the Brekken Church was built there. The name comes from the word  which means "hill".

Government
While it existed, this municipality was responsible for primary education (through 10th grade), outpatient health services, senior citizen services, unemployment, social services, zoning, economic development, and municipal roads. During its existence, this municipality was governed by a municipal council of elected representatives, which in turn elected a mayor.

Municipal council
The municipal council  of Brekken was made up of 13 representatives that were elected to four year terms. The party breakdown of the final municipal council was as follows:

Mayors
The mayors of Brekken:

 1926–1936: Svend N. Borgos (Bp)
 1937–1942: Jacob J. Ryen (Ap)
 1942–1945: Anders J. Stensaas (NS)
 1945–1955: Jacob J. Ryen (Ap)
 1956–1963: Per A. Strickert (Ap)

See also
List of former municipalities of Norway

References

Røros
Former municipalities of Norway
1926 establishments in Norway
1964 disestablishments in Norway